The Central West District Rugby Union, or CWRU, is the governing body for the sport of rugby union within the Central West district of New South Wales in Australia. It is a member of the New South Wales Country Rugby Union.

History
Blowes Cup 1st Grade Premiers

Clubs

Blowes Clothing Cup teams (tier-one)

New Holland Agriculture Cup teams (tier-two)

Oilsplus Cup (tier-three north)

South West Fuels Cup

See also 

Rugby union in New South Wales
List of Australian club rugby union competitions

References

External links
 
 

Rugby union governing bodies in New South Wales
Central West (New South Wales)